Mount Rumble is a  mountain summit located in the Chugach Mountains, in Anchorage Municipality in the U.S. state of Alaska. On a clear day the peak can be seen from the George Parks Highway.

Climate

Based on the Köppen climate classification, Mount Rumble is located in a subarctic climate zone with long, cold, snowy winters, and mild summers. Weather systems coming off the Gulf of Alaska are forced upwards by the Chugach Mountains (orographic lift), causing heavy precipitation in the form of rainfall and snowfall. Temperatures can drop below −20 °C with wind chill factors below −30 °C. Precipitation runoff from the peak drains into Peters Creek.

See also
 
Geology of Alaska

References

Rumble
Rumble